Quincy Public Schools (QPS) is a school district that manages schools in Quincy, Massachusetts, USA. The superintendent is Kevin W. Mulvey, It serves a population of approximately 94,470 of whom approx. 11% are school age.

History
The Quincy Public Schools first superintendent was Francis W. Parker. F. W. Parker Elementary School was named after him. In June 2021, South West Middle School was placed into a state program for schools or districts that disproportionately suspend nonwhite students or students with disabilities.

Elementary schools
 Amelio Della Chiesa Early Childhood Center (preschool)
 Atherton Hough Elementary School
 Beechwood Knoll Elementary School
Charles .A. Bernazzani Elementary School
 Lincoln-Hancock Elementary School
 Clifford Marshall Elementary School
 Merrymount Elementary School 
 Montclair Elementary School
 Parker Elementary School
 Snug Harbor Elementary School (elementary and preschool)
 Squantum Elementary School
 Wollaston Elementary School

Middle schools
 Atlantic Middle School
 Broad Meadows Middle School
 Central Middle School
 Point Webster Middle School
 Southwest Middle School

High schools
 Quincy High School
 North Quincy High School

Notable alumni 

 Priscilla Chan
Dick Dale
John Cheever
Ruth Gordon
Robert Burns Woodward

External links
 Official site

References

School districts in Massachusetts
Education in Quincy, Massachusetts